Caristanius veracruzensis is a species of snout moth in the genus Caristanius. It was described by Herbert H. Neunzig in 2004, and is known from Veracruz, Mexico.

References

Moths described in 2004
Phycitinae